Claire Tarplee (born 22 September 1988) is an Irish middle-distance runner. She competed in the 1500 metres event at the 2014 IAAF World Indoor Championships.

References

External links
 

1988 births
Living people
Irish female middle-distance runners
Place of birth missing (living people)